Ninni Charlotta Laaksonen (born 9 January 1986, in Helsinki) is a model, former titleholder of Miss Finland (2006) and a former Miss Universe contestant. She presently runs a clothing and beauty products company called Ninnin Lifestyle & Living.

In October 2016, Laaksonen reported that she was groped by Donald Trump. The incident occurred before her appearance on the Late Show with David Letterman in 2006.

References

External links 

 Model portfolio, 2013

Miss Finland winners
Miss Universe 2006 contestants
1986 births
Finnish female models
Models from Helsinki
Living people